The Pilot School was an experimental program that was housed within the public Rindge Technical High School in Cambridge, Massachusetts from 1969-2000.

The Pilot School was founded in 1969 as a joint venture of the Cambridge public schools and the Harvard Graduate School of Education. The Pilot School was established to offer a small classroom experience including outside-of-school experiences.

The school closed in June 2000 as part of an overall restructuring of the Cambridge Rindge and Latin School, of which it was a part.

References

Public high schools in Massachusetts
Education in Cambridge, Massachusetts
Schools in Middlesex County, Massachusetts
1969 establishments in Massachusetts
Defunct schools in Massachusetts